Carl Johnson (September 18, 1892 – February 15, 1970) was a U.S. soccer midfielder.  He was the first U.S. player from Chicago to play for the national team.  Johnson earned two caps with the U.S. national team.  His first came at the 1924 Summer Olympics when he played in the U.S. loss to Uruguay in the quarterfinals.  Following the tournament, the U.S. had two exhibition games.  Johnson played in the first, a 3–2 win over Poland.  Johnson played with the Chicago Swedish-Americans.

He died in Tampa, Florida.

References

1892 births
1970 deaths
United States men's international soccer players
Olympic soccer players of the United States
Footballers at the 1924 Summer Olympics
Soccer players from Chicago
Swedish emigrants to the United States
American soccer players
Association football midfielders